The RotorWay Scorpion is a family of helicopters manufactured by RotorWay International.

Design and development
Derived from an original design by B.J. Schramm, the Schramm Javelin evolved into the Schramm Scorpion, both of which were developed by the Schramm Aircraft Company. A new company, RotorWay Aircraft Inc., was formed to market and produce plans and kits for the Scorpion, described as a production version of the earlier Javelin. Production of kits started in 1967 with the original Scorpion model, and ended with the discontinuation of the Scorpion 145 in 1984.

Scorpion

The Scorpion prototype was built in 1966, followed by the production of Scorpion kits in 1968.

Gross Weight: about 700 lb (318 kg)
Useful Load: 425 lb (193 kg)
Range: 160 miles (257 km)
Cruise Speed: 65 mph (105 km/h)
Rate of Climb: 900 ft/min at sea level

Scorpion Too

The Scorpion Too, or Scorpion II, was the first two-seater manufactured by RotorWay. It took about 2,000 hours to complete.
Gross weight: 1,125 lb (510 kg)
Useful load: 435 lb (197 kg)
Range: 125 miles (201 km)
Cruise speed: 75 mph (121 km/h)
Rate of climb: 1,000 ft/min at sea level

Scorpion 133

Introduced in 1976, the Scorpion 133 was no different from the Scorpion Too, except for the new RW133 engine installed. This engine, the first built by RotorWay, was a 4-cylinder, 4-cycle,  engine.
Gross Weight: 1,235 lb (560 kg)
Useful Load: 420 lb (191 kg)
Range:  with one person,  with two people
Cruise Speed: 80 mph (129 km/h)
Rate of Climb: 800 ft/min

Scorpion 145

Produced briefly in 1984, the Scorpion 145 mounted the RW145 engine developed by RotorWay.

Specifications (Scorpion Too)

See also
RotorWay Exec
Homebuilt aircraft

Notes

References

Taylor, John W.R.. Jane's All The World's Aircraft 1976-77. London: Jane's Yearbooks, 1976. .
Taylor, John W.R.. Jane's All the World's Aircraft 1982-83. Jane's Publishing Company. London. 1982. 

1960s United States civil utility aircraft
1960s United States helicopters
Homebuilt aircraft
Aircraft first flown in 1966
Single-engined piston helicopters